Nin9 2 5ive is Joey Yung's seventh Cantonese full-length studio album, released on 29 April 2004. The theme of the album is about life in the city, which is why the album is called Nin9 2 5ive (9-5, symbolising the average "city person's" working hours). As with Joey's last two albums, this album also includes several preludes and interludes. The character 溶 is just a shorter and more simple version of 凝溶 (溶 means Melt, while 凝溶 means Solidify). The maintrack and first "plug/single" of the album is 一拍兩散, and secondary maintracks includes 世上只有, 夢路, and 借過.  Sand Entering the Eyes also incorporated Bossa Rosa style.

Track listing
溶 Melting
夢路 Dreamroad
Gimme n A (Interlude)
最後勝利 Final Victory
真身上陣 True Self
吹沙入眼 Sand Entering the Eyes
一拍兩散 Once Going with You
朱古力萬歲 Chocolate Hurray
3:08 pm 銅鑼灣 3:08 pm in Causeway Bay (Interlude)
借過 Excuse me
候鳥樹 Tree of Migratory Birds
世上只有(刀嘜[好媽媽]廣告主題曲) Only You in the World
凝溶 Solidifying

References

Joey Yung albums
2004 albums